James Livingston (7 February 1840 – 7 May 1915) was a New Zealand soldier and community leader. He was born on 7 February 1840. In 1870 he married English-born artist Louisa Elizabeth Livingston (née Caldwell) in Wellington, and they together had three sons and one daughter.

References

1840 births
1915 deaths
New Zealand military personnel
People of the New Zealand Wars
Scottish expatriates in New Zealand